Domain-specific entertainment languages are a group of domain-specific languages that are used describe computer games or environments, or potentially used for other entertainment such as video or music.

Game languages 
Extensible Graphical Game Generator - language which is used to generate games 
Zillions of Games - for grid-based games
ViGL Video Game Language 
Py-VGDL Python Video Game Description Language 
Ludi Game Description Language
Game Description Language
General Game Description Language for Incomplete Information
World Description Language
Argonaut Strat Language
UnrealScript also Kismet, Blueprints
GameXML
Xconq
The Card Game Language
The Card Game Description Language
The Strategy Games Description Language
Stanford Gamut - command line program for generating games

Interactive fiction 
Inform 7
Zork Implementation Language — used by Infocom
TADS — Text Adventure Development System
Ren'Py — A visual novel engine

MUDs 

LambdaMOO has a specific programming language that users use to extend the system.
In LPMuds, LPC is used to extend the system.  SWLPC is one variant on it.
TinyMUCK and derivatives use the language MUF.
ColdC is another C-derived MUD language, used by ColdMUD.
MUME developed and publishes its language Mudlle.
DG scripts are a content-development scripting language for MUDs.

Music

Movies 
"Media Streams", an MIT Media Labs and Interval Research project by Marc Davis

See also 
Game integrated development environment

References

External links
Programming languages used for music
Jeroen Dobbe's Master's Thesis

 
Video game development